Sir Owen Tudor (2 February 1461) was a Welsh courtier and the second husband of Queen Catherine of Valois (1401–1437), widow of King Henry V of England. He was the grandfather of Henry VII, founder of the Tudor dynasty.

Background 

Owen was a descendant of a prominent family from Penmynydd on the Isle of Anglesey, which traces its lineage back to Ednyfed Fychan (d. 1246), a Welsh official and seneschal to the Kingdom of Gwynedd. Tudor's grandfather, Tudur ap Goronwy, married Margaret, daughter of Thomas ap Llywelyn ab Owain of Cardiganshire, the last male of the senior branch of the princely house of Deheubarth. Margaret's elder sister married Gruffudd Fychan of Glyndyfrdwy, whose son was Owain Glyndŵr. Owen's father, Maredudd ap Tudur, and his uncles were prominent in Owain Glyndŵr's revolt against English rule, the Glyndŵr Rising.

Historians consider the descendants of Ednyfed Fychan, including Owen Tudor, one of the most powerful families in 13th to 14th-century Wales.  The descendants of his many sons would form a wealthy 'ministerial aristocracy', acting as leading servants to the princes of Gwynedd, and play a key role in the attempts to create a single Welsh principality. This privilege endured after the Conquest of Wales by Edward I with the family continuing to exercise power in the name of the king of England, within Wales. However, there remained an awareness of the family's Welsh heritage and the accompanying loyalties led them to take part in the suppressed Glyndŵr Rising.

Early life 
The fact that little is known about Tudor's early life and that it has instead become largely mythologized is attributed to his family's part in the Glyndŵr Rising. At various times it has been said that he was the bastard son of an alehouse keeper, that his father was a fugitive murderer, that he fought at Agincourt, that he was keeper of Queen Catherine's household or wardrobe, that he was an esquire of Henry V, and that his relationship with Catherine began when he fell into the queen's lap while dancing or caught the queen's eye when swimming. 

The sixteenth-century Welsh chronicler Elis Gruffydd did note that he was her sewer (someone who places dishes on the table and tastes them) and servant. However, it is known that after the Glyndŵr Rising several Welshmen secured positions at court, and in May 1421 an 'Owen Meredith' joined the retinue of Sir Walter Hungerford, 1st Baron Hungerford, the steward of the king's household from 1415 until 1421.

Catherine of Valois 
Henry V of England died on 31 August 1422, leaving his wife, Queen Catherine, widowed. The dowager queen initially lived with her infant son, King Henry VI, before moving to Wallingford Castle early in his reign. 

Catherine was rumoured to have had an affair with Edmund Beaufort, 2nd Duke of Somerset. These rumours, though based on questionable evidence, prompted a response from her son's regents, who objected to Somerset as a possible husband as he was a second cousin of Henry V through the legitimised Beaufort line sired by John of Gaunt. A parliamentary statute regulating the remarriage of widowed queens was passed. She subsequently married Owen Tudor and gave birth to three sons: Edmund, Jasper and Edward (see below).

Historian G. L. Harriss suggested that the affair with Beaufort resulted in the birth of Edmund Tudor. Harriss wrote, "By its very nature the evidence for Edmund Tudor's parentage is less than conclusive, but such facts, as can be assembled, permit an agreeable possibility that Edmund 'Tudor' and Margaret Beaufort were first cousins and that the royal house of 'Tudor' sprang in fact from Beauforts on both sides."

Life after Catherine's death 
Following Queen Catherine's death, Owen Tudor lost the protection from the statute on dowager queens' remarriage and was imprisoned in Newgate Prison. In 1438 he escaped but was later recaptured and held in the custody of the constable of Windsor Castle. 

In 1439, Henry VI of England granted him a general pardon, restoring his goods and lands. In addition, Henry VI granted him a pension of £40 per annum, provided him with a position in court, and appointed him the Keeper of the King's Parks in Denbigh. In 1442, Henry VI welcomed his two half-brothers, Edmund and Jasper, to court. In November 1452, they were created earls of Richmond and Pembroke with the acknowledgement that they were the king's half-brothers. 

In 1459, Tudor's pension was increased to £100 per annum. Owen and Jasper were commissioned to arrest a servant of John Dwnn of Kidwelly, a Yorkist, and later that year, Tudor acquired an interest in the forfeited estates of another Yorkist, John, Lord Clinton. On 5 February 1460, Tudor and Jasper were granted life offices in the Duke of York's lordship of Denbigh, a prelude to them later seizing lordship.

Death 
Owen Tudor was an early casualty of the Wars of the Roses (1455–1487) between the House of Lancaster and the House of York. He joined his son Jasper's army in Wales in January 1461, a force that was defeated at the Battle of Mortimer's Cross by Edward of York. On 2 February, Owen Tudor was captured and beheaded at Hereford. His head was placed on the market cross there, "and a madde woman kembyd hys here and wysche a way the blode of hys face" and set 100 candles about him. 

Owen Tudor had expected to be imprisoned rather than executed. Moments before his execution he realised that he was to die and murmured "that hede shalle ly on the stocke that wass wonte to ly on Quene Katheryns lappe." His body was buried in a chapel on the north side of the Greyfriars' Church in Hereford. He had no memorial until his illegitimate son, David, paid for a tomb before the friary was dissolved.

Issue 
An ancient pedigree chart of the English royal family, dated , 
 Edmund (ca. 1430 – 1 November 1456) was born at either Much Hadham Palace in Hertfordshire or at Hadham in Bedfordshire. Edmund became the 1st Earl of Richmond in 1452 and later married Margaret Beaufort. In 1456 he died of plague in Carmarthen, three months before the birth of the couple's son at Pembroke Castle. That son, Henry, later became king of England and founded the Tudor dynasty.
 Jasper (ca. November 1431 – 26 December 1495) was born at Hatfield. He became the 1st Earl of Pembroke in 1452 but was branded as a traitor in 1461. However, he became the 1st Duke of Bedford in 1485. He was the second husband of Catherine Woodville, widow of the Duke of Buckingham and sister of Elizabeth Woodville, wife of Edward IV. They had no issue. Jasper had one illegitimate daughter named Ellen Tudor. Ellen married (1st) William Gardiner, of London, skinner (died testate 1485), by whom she had five children: Thomas (King's chaplain, Prior of Blyth, Nottinghamshire, Prior of Tynemouth, Northumberland), Philippe, Margaret, Beatrice, and Anne. Ellen married (2nd) before 1493 William Sibson (or Sybson), of London, skinner. In the period 1501–2, Peter Watson of London, draper, and William Sybson, husband of Ellen, late the wife of William Gardiner, sued the mayor, aldermen, and sheriffs of London in Chancery on behalf of the children of William Gardiner, to recover the portion of William's son, Thomas Gardiner, who had entered Westminster Abbey.  
 Edward Tudor. Very little is known of this child's life. The Tudor historian Polydore Vergil stated this child, whom he did not name, became "a monke of the order of St. Benet, and lived not longe after". William Camden referred to this child as Edward Tudor, and indicated that he lies buried in the chapel of St Blaise in Westminster Abbey, near the tomb of Abbot Nicholas Litlington. Even so, he is called Owen Tudor in most published sources, the reasons for which are not clear. The modern historian Pearce has shown, however, that no monk named either Edward or Owen Tudor existed at Westminster Abbey in this time period. An alternative theory advanced by Pearce is that Edward Tudor is the same person as Edward Bridgewater, a known monk at Westminster Abbey, who died c.1471. This theory appears to be groundless.
 Polydore Vergil says Owen and Queen Katherine also had a daughter who became a nun, though no other source corroborates this.

Owen Tudor had at least one illegitimate child, by an unknown mistress:

 Sir David Owen was born in 1459 at Pembroke Castle. He later acquired Southwick Court in Wiltshire before marrying an heiress who brought with her the Cowdray estate in Sussex. He is buried in the priory church of Easebourne, near Midhurst.

Ancestry 
Owen was a descendant of Rhys ap Gruffydd (1132–1197), ruler of the kingdom of Deheubarth, via the lineages that follow:

Rhys had a daughter, Gwenllian ferch (daughter of) Rhys, who married Ednyfed Fychan, Seneschal of the Kingdom of Gwynedd (d. 1246).

Ednyfed Fychan and Gwenllian ferch Rhys were the parents of Goronwy ab Ednyfed, Lord of Tref-gastell (d. 1268). Goronwy was married to Morfydd ferch Meurig, daughter of Meurig of Gwent. Meurig was the son of Ithel, grandson of Rhydd and great-grandson of Iestyn ap Gwrgant, the last king of Morgannwg (reigned 1081–1091) before its conquest by the Normans.

Goronwy and Morfydd were parents of Tudur Hen, Lord of Penmynydd (d. 1311). Tudur Hen married Angharad ferch Ithel Fychan, daughter of Ithel Fychan ap Ithel Gan, Lord of Englefield. They were the parents of Goronwy ap Tudur Hen, Lord of Penmynydd (d. 1331).

Goronwy ap Tudur was married to Gwerfyl ferch Madog, daughter of Madog ap Dafydd, Baron of Hendwr. They were the parents of Tudur ap Goronwy, also known as Tudur Fychan ("Tudur the Little") to distinguish him from his grandfather Tudur Hen ("Tudur the Old"), Lord of Penmynydd (d. 1367).

Tudur Fychan married Margaret ferch Thomas of Is Coed, of the native and Ancient Royal Houses of Wales. Margaret and her sisters, Ellen and Eleanor, were descended from Angharad ferch Llywelyn, daughter of Llywelyn the Great.

Tudur and Margaret were parents to Maredudd ap Tudur (died 1406). Maredudd married Margaret ferch Dafydd, the daughter of Dafydd Fychan, Lord of Anglesey, and his wife, Nest ferch Ieuan.

Maredudd ap Tudur and Margaret ferch Dafydd were the parents of Owen Tudor.

Notes

References

Bibliography

 
 
 
 
 124

External links 
 

1400 births
1461 deaths
15th-century Welsh military personnel
Owen
Owen
People of the Wars of the Roses
Welsh soldiers
People from Anglesey
People from Wallingford, Oxfordshire
Executed Welsh people
People executed under the Yorkists
People executed under the Plantagenets by decapitation
Knights banneret of England